Eleonora Bretz  is a Greek and Luxembourgish model and beauty contestant.  She won the "B Miss Hellas" title in the Star Hellas beauty pageant in June 2010, and represented Greece in the 2010 Miss International pageant.

She is a professional model who lives in Greece.

References 

1989 births
Living people
Luxembourgian female models
Greek beauty pageant winners
Greek people of Luxembourgian descent
Luxembourgian people of Greek descent